Julian Rossi Ashton  (27 January 185127 April 1942) was an English-born Australian artist and teacher. He is best known for founding the Julian Ashton Art School in Sydney and encouraging Australian painters to capture local life and scenery en plein air, greatly influencing the impressionist Heidelberg School movement.

He was a principal organiser of the 1898 Exhibition of Australian Art in London, the first major exhibition of Australian art internationally.

Biography

Ashton was born in Addlestone, Surrey, the son of American amateur painter Thomas Briggs Ashton, and his wife Henrietta, daughter of Count Carlo Rossi, a Sardinian diplomat who married the soprano Henriette Sontag. The family moved to Penzance, Cornwall shortly after, and lived at Burley Grove, Gulval. At the age of 11, the family moved again to Totnes, Devon. His father died in 1864, and around age 15 he began working in the engineers' office of either the Great Western Railway or Great Eastern Railway. There he remained for six years using his entire leisure time painting at South Kensington. During this time he studied at the West London School of Art for three years. He then went to study at the Académie Julian in Paris and began illustrating books. He also had considerable success as a painter, exhibiting at the Royal Academy of Arts and elsewhere.

Ashton emigrated to Melbourne in 1878 under contract to David Syme's Illustrated Australian News and lived there for five years before moving to Sydney.

He was the elected president of the Art Society of New South Wales from 1886 to 1892. From 1892 to 1895 he taught classes on behalf of the society but was dismissed after choosing to exhibit his works with the newly formed Society of Artists.

He had a background in the contemporary French realism of the Barbizon School, which emphasised painting en plein air (i.e. direct from nature, as opposed to studio-based painting), and which laid the basis for the Impressionist movement. As a trustee of the Art Gallery of New South Wales he championed emerging Australian artists of the Australian Impressionist or Heidelberg School, and the Gallery's decision to collect these works owes much to his influence. Ashton is known for his paintings Evening, Merri Creek (1882), A Solitary Ramble (1888) and others.

George Lambert painted a portrait of Ashton which is in the Art Gallery of New South Wales. Lambert showed Ashton, then 77, with white hair and a military-type moustache, dressed in a grey suit and a dapper bow-tie, cigar in hand, sitting beside a table with a mass of objects. The cigar and wine suggest 'good living' and the flowers and fruit may have referred to Ashton's role as a gardener. Behind him there is a deep red curtain draped over a gold picture frame, behind which there is a curtain, creating an abstract arrangement of bold colours, with the frame suggesting Ashton's role as an artist, teacher and patron.

Julian Ashton Art School

The Sydney Art School (also known as the Julian Ashton Art School), which Ashton established in 1890 as the "Academy Julian", has been an influential art school in Australia.

Julian Ashton students have included William Dobell, John Olsen, Fred Leist, Brett Whiteley, and Nora Heysen.

(Julian) Howard Ashton's son, J. Richard Ashton, and his wife Wenda ran the School from 1960, when, among many gifted artists, Ian Chapman and Archibald Prize winner Francis Giacco attended, until 1977 when Phillip Ashton (Richard's son) became Principal, this being the time of Hadyn Wilson, political cartoonist Bill Leak and artist Paul Newton.

In 1988 the school was incorporated and Paul Delprat, Julian Ashton's great-grandson, himself an ex-student took over the running of the school, becoming the principal. In 1989 the school's antique casts and easels, which date back to 1890, were classified by the National Trust. The school's main campus is in The Rocks, Sydney, located opposite the Museum of Contemporary Art Australia at 117–119 George Street, The Rocks. The building is listed on the New South Wales State Heritage Register. Since 2004 the school has also conducted classes at Headland Park, Georges Heights, Mosman.

Family

Ashton married twice: to Eliza Ann Pugh (died 15 July 1900) in Hackney, London on 1 August 1876, by whom he had four sons and a daughter.

 (J)ulian Howard Ashton (9 August 1877 – 30 April 1964), journalist, artist, and writer and critic.

 Rupert Rossi Ashton (c. 1885 – 4 March 1895).

 Percy G. Ashton established a plantation in the New Hebrides, before becoming a soldier in World War I. His first wife died in May 1918. He later married jewellery designer Rhoda Wager in March 1920.

 Bertha Ashton married W(illiam) Charlton Hubble (1880 – 17 February 1949) in July 1923. He was the (divorced) ex-husband of Georgina Temperley. Their son Tom Hubble went on to become a farmer and artist of no distinction.  

He married again, on 8 September 1902 to (Constance) Irene Morley (died 11 April 1946).

On Monday, 27 April 1942 Ashton died at Bondi, Sydney, aged 91, after a long illness. Until his death he had still been an art teacher to others.  The service for the 'Grand Old Man of Australian art' was held at the Northern Suburbs Crematorium on 29 April 1942.

Ashton also had a brother, George Rossi Ashton (born 1857), a black-and-white artist who lived in Australia between the years 1878 and 1893 before returning to London. He married Blanche Brooke Coppin, a daughter of George Coppin, in Melbourne on 23 October 1883.

Recognition

He was appointed a Commander of the Order of the British Empire (CBE) in 1930.

Selected paintings

References

Bibliography

 Gray, Anne. George W Lambert Retrospective – Heroes and Icons. Canberra: National Gallery of Australia, 2007. .

External links

 
 Website for Julian Ashton Art School
 Julian Ashton at Australian Art

Australian art teachers
Australian schoolteachers
1851 births
1942 deaths
People from Addlestone
People educated at Totnes Grammar School
English emigrants to colonial Australia
Australian Commanders of the Order of the British Empire
19th-century Australian painters
19th-century Australian male artists
20th-century Australian painters
20th-century Australian male artists
Australian writers
Australian etchers
Australian landscape painters
English people of American descent
English people of Italian descent
Australian male painters